Kenneth Roth Forsch (born September 8, 1946) is an American former professional baseball player. A two-time All-Star player, Forsch pitched a no-hitter for the Astros on April 7, 1979. He ended his baseball career playing for the California Angels.

Career

Forsch was born in Sacramento, California where he graduated from Hiram Johnson High School and later attended the Oregon State University where he played for the Oregon State Beavers baseball team through the 1967–1968 seasons. He was selected by the Houston Astros in the 18th round (399th overall) of the 1968 Major League Baseball draft. He made his major league debut on September 7, 1970 at the age of 23.

Forsch was selected to the All-Star Game in 1976 and 1981.

On April 7, 1979, Forsch no-hit the Atlanta Braves 6–0 at the Astrodome. His brother Bob Forsch, who also pitched for the Astros, hurled two no-hitters while with the St. Louis Cardinals, making them the only set of brothers to pitch no-hitters in MLB history. During his 16-year career, Forsch compiled 114 wins, 1,047 strikeouts, and a 3.37 earned run average.

See also

 Houston Astros award winners and league leaders
 List of Houston Astros no-hitters
 List of Major League Baseball no-hitters

References

External links

Ken Forsch at Baseball Almanac
Ken Forsch at Pura Pelota (Venezuelan Professional Baseball League)

1946 births
Living people
American expatriate baseball players in Canada
American League All-Stars
American people of Russian descent
Baseball players from Sacramento, California
Calgary Cannons players
California Angels players
Cardenales de Lara players
American expatriate baseball players in Venezuela
Columbus Astros players
Florida Instructional League Astros players
Greensboro Patriots players
Houston Astros players
Los Angeles Angels executives
Major League Baseball pitchers
National League All-Stars
Oklahoma City 89ers players
Oregon State Beavers baseball players
Peninsula Astros players
Sacramento City Panthers baseball players
Tiburones de La Guaira players
Williamsport Astros players